The Italian general election of 2006 took place on 10–11 April 2006.

The election was won in Sardinia by the centre-left The Union, which prevailed also nationally.

Results

Chamber of Deputies

|-
|- bgcolor="#E9E9E9"
!rowspan="1" align="left" valign="top"|Coalitions leaders
!rowspan="1" align="center" valign="top"|votes
!rowspan="1" align="center" valign="top"|votes (%)
!rowspan="1" align="center" valign="top"|seats
!rowspan="1" align="left" valign="top"|Parties
!rowspan="1" align="center" valign="top"|votes
!rowspan="1" align="center" valign="top"|votes (%)
!rowspan="1" align="center" valign="top"|seats
|-
!rowspan="8" align="left" valign="top"|Romano Prodi
|rowspan="8" valign="top"|550,889
|rowspan="8" valign="top"|52.5
|rowspan="8" valign="top"|10

|align="left"|The Olive Tree
Democracy is Freedom – The Daisy
Democrats of the Left
|valign="top"|349,259
|valign="top"|33.3
|valign="top"|6
|-
|align="left"|Communist Refoundation Party
|valign="top"|69,895
|valign="top"|6.7
|valign="top"|1
|-
|align="left"|Party of Italian Communists
|valign="top"|34,200
|valign="top"|3.3
|valign="top"|1
|-
|align="left"|Rose in the Fist
Italian Democratic Socialists
Italian Radicals
|valign="top"|28,808
|valign="top"|2.7
|valign="top"|1
|-
|align="left"|Italy of Values
|valign="top"|24,236
|valign="top"|2.3
|valign="top"|1
|-
|align="left"|Populars–UDEUR
|valign="top"|23,827
|valign="top"|2.3
|valign="top"|-
|-
|align="left"|Federation of the Greens
|valign="top"|13,552
|valign="top"|1.3
|valign="top"|-
|-
|align="left"|Pensioners' Party
|valign="top"|7,115
|valign="top"|0.7
|valign="top"|-

|-
!rowspan="6" align="left" valign="top"|Silvio Berlusconi
|rowspan="6" valign="top"|475,966
|rowspan="6" valign="top"|45.4
|rowspan="6" valign="top"|8

|align="left"|Forza Italia
|valign="top"|236,679
|valign="top"|22.6
|valign="top"|4
|-
|align="left"|National Alliance
|valign="top"|135,247
|valign="top"|12.9
|valign="top"|2
|-
|align="left"|Union of Christian and Centre Democrats
|valign="top"|80,877
|valign="top"|7.7
|valign="top"|2
|-
|align="left"|Social Alternative
|valign="top"|7,828
|valign="top"|0.7
|valign="top"|-
|-
|align="left"|Christian Democracy–Socialist Party
|valign="top"|6,246
|valign="top"|0.6
|valign="top"|-
|-
|align="left"|others
|valign="top"|9,089
|valign="top"|0.9
|valign="top"|-

|-
!rowspan="1" align="left" valign="top"|Gavino Sale
|rowspan="1" valign="top"|11,648
|rowspan="1" valign="top"|1.1
|rowspan="1" valign="top"|-

|align="left"|Independence Republic of Sardinia
|valign="top"|11,648
|valign="top"|1.1
|valign="top"|-
|-
!rowspan="1" align="left" valign="top"|Bastianu Cumpostu
|rowspan="1" valign="top"|11,000
|rowspan="1" valign="top"|1.1
|rowspan="1" valign="top"|-

|align="left"|Sardinia Nation
|valign="top"|11,000
|valign="top"|1.1
|valign="top"|-
|-
|- bgcolor="#E9E9E9"
!rowspan="1" align="left" valign="top"|Total coalitions
!rowspan="1" align="right" valign="top"|1,049,503
!rowspan="1" align="right" valign="top"|100.0
!rowspan="1" align="right" valign="top"|18
!rowspan="1" align="left" valign="top"|Total parties
!rowspan="1" align="right" valign="top"|1,049,503
!rowspan="1" align="right" valign="top"|100.0
!rowspan="1" align="right" valign="top"|18
|}
Source: Ministry of the Interior

Senate

|-
|- bgcolor="#E9E9E9"
!rowspan="1" align="left" valign="top"|Coalitions leaders
!rowspan="1" align="center" valign="top"|votes
!rowspan="1" align="center" valign="top"|votes (%)
!rowspan="1" align="center" valign="top"|seats
!rowspan="1" align="left" valign="top"|Parties
!rowspan="1" align="center" valign="top"|votes
!rowspan="1" align="center" valign="top"|votes (%)
!rowspan="1" align="center" valign="top"|seats
|-
!rowspan="8" align="left" valign="top"|Romano Prodi
|rowspan="8" valign="top"|482,668
|rowspan="8" valign="top"|50.9
|rowspan="8" valign="top"|5

|align="left"|Democrats of the Left
|valign="top"|162,798
|valign="top"|17.2
|valign="top"|2
|-
|align="left"|Democracy is Freedom – The Daisy
|valign="top"|119,084
|valign="top"|12.6
|valign="top"|1
|-
|align="left"|Communist Refoundation Party
|valign="top"|77,870
|valign="top"|8.2
|valign="top"|1
|-
|align="left"|Together with the Union
Federation of the Greens
Party of Italian Communists
|valign="top"|41,847
|valign="top"|4.4
|valign="top"|1
|-
|align="left"|Italy of Values
|valign="top"|28,211
|valign="top"|3.0
|valign="top"|-
|-
|align="left"|Rose in the Fist
Italian Democratic Socialists
Italian Radicals
|valign="top"|23,545
|valign="top"|2.5
|valign="top"|-
|-
|align="left"|Populars–UDEUR
|valign="top"|21,509
|valign="top"|2.3
|valign="top"|-
|-
|align="left"|Pensioners' Party
|valign="top"|7,804
|valign="top"|0.8
|valign="top"|-

|-
!rowspan="6" align="left" valign="top"|Silvio Berlusconi
|rowspan="6" valign="top"|429,731
|rowspan="6" valign="top"|45.3
|rowspan="6" valign="top"|4

|align="left"|Forza Italia
|valign="top"|215,516
|valign="top"|22.7
|valign="top"|2
|-
|align="left"|National Alliance
|valign="top"|122,697
|valign="top"|12.9
|valign="top"|1
|-
|align="left"|Union of Christian and Centre Democrats
|valign="top"|73,673
|valign="top"|7.8
|valign="top"|1
|-
|align="left"|Social Alternative
|valign="top"|6,120
|valign="top"|0.7
|valign="top"|-
|-
|align="left"|Christian Democracy–Socialist Party
|valign="top"|5,920
|valign="top"|0.6
|valign="top"|-
|-
|align="left"|others
|valign="top"|5,805
|valign="top"|0.6
|valign="top"|-

|-
!rowspan="1" align="left" valign="top"|Antonio Delitalia
|rowspan="1" valign="top"|16,733
|rowspan="1" valign="top"|1.8
|rowspan="1" valign="top"|-

|align="left"|Sardinian Action Party
|valign="top"|16,733
|valign="top"|1.8
|valign="top"|-
|-
!rowspan="1" align="left" valign="top"|Gavino Sale
|rowspan="1" valign="top"|10,881
|rowspan="1" valign="top"|1.2
|rowspan="1" valign="top"|-

|align="left"|Independence Republic of Sardinia
|valign="top"|10,881
|valign="top"|1.2
|valign="top"|-
|-
!rowspan="1" align="left" valign="top"|Bastianu Cumpostu
|rowspan="1" valign="top"|8,412
|rowspan="1" valign="top"|0.9
|rowspan="1" valign="top"|-

|align="left"|Sardinia Nation
|valign="top"|8,412
|valign="top"|0.9
|valign="top"|-
|-
|- bgcolor="#E9E9E9"
!rowspan="1" align="left" valign="top"|Total coalitions
!rowspan="1" align="right" valign="top"|948,425
!rowspan="1" align="right" valign="top"|100.0
!rowspan="1" align="right" valign="top"|9
!rowspan="1" align="left" valign="top"|Total parties
!rowspan="1" align="right" valign="top"|948,425
!rowspan="1" align="right" valign="top"|100.0
!rowspan="1" align="right" valign="top"|9
|}
Source: Ministry of the Interior

Elections in Sardinia
2006 elections in Italy
April 2006 events in Europe